The 10th Asian Swimming Championships were held 14–20 November 2016 in Tokyo, Japan.

The Championships is organized by the Asia Swimming Federation (AASF), and in 2016 featured competition in 4 of the 5 Aquatics disciplines in 56 events:
Swimming: 17–20 November (long course) (38);
Synchronized Swimming: 17–20 November (8);
Water Polo: 14–20 November (2); and
Diving: 17–20 November (8).

Venues

Medalists

Swimming

Men's events

Women's events

Swimming Medal Table

Synchronized Swimming

Synchronized Swimming Medal Table

Diving

Diving medal table

Water Polo

Water Polo Medal Table

All Medal Table

References

External links 
 Schedule and Results

Asian Championships